The Honda Battle of the Bands (sometimes abbreviated The Honda or HBOB) is an annual marching band exhibition in the United States which features performances by bands from historically black colleges and universities (HBCUs). Sponsored by the American Honda Motor Company, the Invitational Showcase took place in the Mercedes-Benz Stadium in Atlanta, Georgia in late January from 2003 to 2020.  In 2022, it was announced HBOB selected Alabama State University in Montgomery, Alabama to be the first ever HBCU campus to host the in-person event in February 2023.

The Honda Battle of the Bands Celebration Tour takes place between the months of September and November at regular season football games, although Honda Battle of the Bands (and its abbreviations) is often intended to refer only to the invitational showcase, which first took place in 2003. Seemingly contradictory to the name, Honda's "battle" is not a competition in the traditional sense; that is, no winner is crowned during the event. Rather, the bands compete for the favor of the audience, each other, and the greater community.

The event is historically the most popular collegiate marching band event in the nation, drawing over 50,000 fans and spectators annually.

Participation 
The Honda Battle of the Bands program includes two components — the Voting Process, which runs September through October, and the "Honda Battle of the Bands Invitational Showcase".

Voting:
The first band will be selected by popular vote (i.e. the top overall vote-getter will be selected regardless of category).
The next three bands will be selected, one from each category by a weighted vote of 1/3 from institution president, band director and online opinion poll from category I, II and III. The categories being 128 instruments or less, 129 instruments up to 160 and 161 or more. This count is total instrument count, no auxiliaries, drum majors, etc. but will include percussion.

a. Online Opinion Poll at hondabattleofthebands.com -- 1/3 weight
b. Band Directors’ Votes -- 1/3 weight
c. Presidents’ Votes -- 1/3 weight

Note: Presidents and Band Directors are not permitted to vote for their own institutions.
American Honda and Urban Sports & Entertainment Group will select the final four bands based on, but not limited to:
a. Showmanship
b. Social Media Buzz
c. Years of previous participation in the Celebration Tour

Once all the votes are tallied, a total of 8 bands are invited to perform their carefully choreographed, halftime time routines in front of 50,000+ fans.

History 
Started in 2003, the Honda Battle of the Bands was created to celebrate, support and recognize the excellence of Black college marching bands and the unique academic experience offered by Historically Black Colleges and Universities (HBCUs). Honda annually awards more than $205,000 in grants to participating marching bands during the program period and facilitates a HBCU recruitment fair preceding the band showcase.

The following HBCUs have participated in the Honda Invitational Showcase:

In 2018, Honda announced that the Battle of the Bands would be on a one-year hiatus in 2019, due to Super Bowl LIII being held in Atlanta. The event resumed in 2020.

In 2020, Honda announced the Battle of the Bands will be on a one-year hiatus in 2021, due to the COVID-19 pandemic.

In 2021, Honda announced the Battle of the Bands in-person event is cancelled again due to the COVID-19 pandemic, however a virtual event will likely take place in 2022.

In 2022, Honda announced the Battle of the Bands will return as an in-person event in 2023 and they will release a four-part docuseries celebrating HBCU culture and bands on February 26, 2022.

Trivia
 The fictitious BET Big Southern Classic from the 2002 film Drumline was similar to the HBOB, with the main difference that the Big Southern Classic was a competition with a declared winner. The HBOB is an invitational showcase and there are usually no official winners.
In 2014, HBOB declared an official winner for the first time and it was North Carolina A&T's marching band.  HBOB has only declared an official winner once in the history of the event.
With 13 appearances as of 2020, Bethune-Cookman's marching band leads with the most invitations to the HBOB.

See also
Historically black colleges and universities
HBCU band
Honda Campus All-Star Challenge
African Americans in Atlanta

References

External links

 North Carolina A&T wins 12th annual Honda Battle of the Bands

College marching bands in the United States
Music of Atlanta
African-American events
Music competitions in the United States
Sports and historically black universities and colleges in the United States
Honda
Tourist attractions in Atlanta
2003 establishments in Georgia (U.S. state)
Recurring events established in 2003